Erik Evju is a Norwegian musician, playing dark neo-folk music under the name Weh. He recorded several demos between 2002 and 2006, all of which were compiled and eventually released on CD in 2011 via Soulseller Records as the double album Origins. In 2005, following the death of Windir vocalist Terje "Valfar" Bakken, Evju was asked by Hvall (Windir/Vreid) if he would contribute a song to a planned tribute album for Valfar. Under the Weh name Evju recorded the song Likbør from Windir's first album Sóknardalr with Morten Hennum Nicolaysen producing.

Most of these songs were in English, but some were in Evju's native Norwegian. Evju released his first full-length album En Natt Kom Doed in 2012, which featured more Norwegian-language songs than English ones.

Ingenmannsland was released in December 2015.

Evju started a black metal project named Ene under the alias Erik E. Ene's first album, Lang kald natt, was released on 12 March 2021.

Discography

Weh 
The Death EP (demo, 2002)
All The Sinners Are Sleeping Now (demo, 2003)
The Coffee's Cold In The Morning, The Beer's Warm At Night (demo, 2004)
Hoof & Horn (demo, 2005)
North (demo, 2006)
Origins (demos compilation, 2011)
En Natt Kom Doed (2012)
 Folkloren (2013)
 Ingenmannsland (2015)

Ene 
Lang kald natt (2021)

Other contributions 
Likbør on Valfar, Ein Windir (Windir tribute album, 2005)
Empty on Kraft (Vreid, 2004)

References

External links 

Soulseller Records website

Norwegian male musicians
Living people
Year of birth missing (living people)